The 2012 World Curling Championships may refer to one of the following curling championships:
2012 World Men's Curling Championship
2012 Ford World Women's Curling Championship
2012 World Junior Curling Championships
2012 World Senior Curling Championships
2012 World Wheelchair Curling Championship
2012 World Mixed Doubles Curling Championship

Wo